Mohammad Sadegh Firouzpour is an Iranian freestyle wrestler.

In 2022, Firouzpour won the silver medal in the 74 kg event at the 2021 Islamic Solidarity Games held in Konya, Turkey. He also won a gold medal at the 2022 U23 World Wrestling Championships in the category 74 kg held in Pontevedra, Spain.

His brother, Amir Hossein, is a wrestler too.

References

External links 
 
 

Living people
People from Juybar
Iranian male sport wrestlers
Sportspeople from Mazandaran province
20th-century Iranian people
21st-century Iranian people
Islamic Solidarity Games competitors for Iran
Year of birth missing (living people)